Lyclene zinchenkoi is a moth of the subfamily Arctiinae. It was described by Vladimir Viktorovitch Dubatolov and Karol Bucsek in 2013. It is found in Thailand.

The length of the forewings is about 9 mm.

References

Nudariina
Moths described in 2013
Moths of Asia